Edward Curtis Franklin (March 1, 1862 – February 13, 1937) was an American chemist.

Biography
Edward Franklin was born in Geary County, Kansas. He entered the University of Kansas at the age of 22, obtaining his major in chemistry in 1888. Two years later he decided to study at the University of Berlin for one year, but abandon it by 1891. In 1892 he came back to State University where he remained till 1893 working as assistant chemist. He graduated from Johns Hopkins University where he received his doctorate in chemistry a year later. He then came back to University of Kansas where he spent one year as a chemist while the rest of the years he was an associate professor there. He also worked as associate manager for a mining project in Costa Rica where he remained till he was informed about coming to Stanford University in 1903. From 1911 to 1913 he served as chief of the Division of Chemistry of the Public Health Service in Washington state. As life went by, he started to receive honours from home and abroad including Nichols and Willard Gibbs Awards. He was elected as a president of the American Chemical Society and became a member of both the National Academy of Sciences and the American Philosophical Society. Franklin got invited to participate at the British Association for the Advancement of Science at Melbourne, Australia, and Johannesburg, South Africa. He died on February 13, 1937, from coronary thrombosis.

Siblings
William Suddards Franklin
Nelle Franklin
Joseph Franklin
Thomas Z. Franklin

Children
Anna Comstock Franklin
Peter Charles Scott Franklin
John Curtis Franklin I

References

Further reading

1862 births
1937 deaths
American chemists
Johns Hopkins University alumni
University of Kansas alumni